Hiett is an unincorporated community in Brown County, in the U.S. state of Ohio.

History
A post office called Hiett was established in 1872, and remained in operation until 1903. Besides the post office, Hiett had a church and several stores.

References

Unincorporated communities in Brown County, Ohio
1872 establishments in Ohio
Unincorporated communities in Ohio